The Ecclesiastical Jurisdiction Measure 1963 was introduced to simplify ecclesiastical law as it applied to the Church of England, following the recommendations of the 1954 Archbishops' Commission on Ecclesiastical Courts.  Superseding the Ecclesiastical Jurisdiction Act 1677, other acts of Parliament it repealed included the Church Discipline Act 1840, the Public Worship Regulation Act 1874, the Clergy Discipline Act 1892, and the Incumbents (Discipline) Measure 1947.

The first person to be prosecuted under the new measure was Michael Bland in 1969. The charges against him related to neglect of his duties, and included leaving church services early, refusing to baptise a baby, preventing one of his parishioners from entering the church to object to the marriage of his son when the banns were published, and disallowing another parishioner from receiving Holy Communion without just cause.

References

Footnotes

Bibliography

1963 in Christianity
1963 in law
Church of England legislation